Utah Proposition 4 was a ballot measure narrowly approved as part of the 2018 Utah elections. The proposition created an independent redistricting commission in the state, a measure to avoid gerrymandering.

In 2020, the Utah legislature passed Senate Bill 200 which compromised positions between Better Boundaries Utah (the sponsor of the proposition) and the Utah legislature.

Results

The proposal was approved narrowly, with 50.34% of the vote. The closeness of the result was hypothesized to be due to Republicans, the dominant party in Utah, voting against the proposition to maintain their total control over redistricting.

References

Utah ballot measures
2018 ballot measures